Sandwich Township is one of nineteen townships in DeKalb County, Illinois, USA. As of the 2010 census, its population was 7,709 and it contained 3,005 housing units. Sandwich Township was formed from a portion of Somonauk Township on July 14, 1896.

Geography

Cities, towns, villages
 Sandwich (west three-quarters)

Cemeteries
 Oaklawn
 Saint Paul's Catholic

Airports and landing strips
 Gord Airport
 Hospital Heliport
 Sandwich Airport
 Woodlake Landing Airport

Demographics

School districts
 Sandwich Community Unit School District 430
 Somonauk Community Unit School District 432

Political districts
 Illinois's 14th congressional district
 State House District 70
 State Senate District 35

References
 
 US Census Bureau 2009 TIGER/Line Shapefiles
 US National Atlas

External links
 City-Data.com
 Illinois State Archives
 Township Officials of Illinois
 DeKalb County Official Site

Townships in DeKalb County, Illinois
Populated places established in 1896
Townships in Illinois